CHOP-FM is a high school radio station that operates at 102.7 FM in Newmarket, Ontario, Canada.

Owned by Pickering College, the station began broadcasting on September 28, 2007, after it was given approval by the Canadian Radio-television and Telecommunications Commission (CRTC) on February 1, 2007. The station was modelled after another high school radio station in the province called CKVI-FM located in Kingston, Ontario.

On November 12, 2021, the CRTC issued a call for comments on market capacity to serve Newmarket, Ontario and call for applications to serve Newmarket. The  station also submitted an application to increase CHOP-FM's effective radiated power (ERP) from 5 watts LP to 100 watts class A1.  

On December 5, 2022, Pickering College Campus Radio submitted an application to operate an English language community FM radio station at Newmarket which would operate at 102.7 MHz (channel 274A1) with an average effective radiated power (ERP) of 33.5 watts (maximum ERP of 100 watts, and an effective height of the antenna above average terrain [EHAAT] of 9 metres).

References

External links
102.7 CHOP-FM

Hop
Newmarket, Ontario
Hop
Radio stations established in 2007
2007 establishments in Ontario